C-C chemokine receptor type 3 is a protein that in humans is encoded by the CCR3 gene.

CCR3 has also recently been designated CD193 (cluster of differentiation 193).

Function 

The protein encoded by this gene is a receptor for C-C type chemokines. It belongs to family 1 of the G protein-coupled receptors. This receptor binds and responds to a variety of chemokines, including eotaxin (CCL11), eotaxin-3 (CCL26), MCP-3 (CCL7), MCP-4 (CCL13), and RANTES (CCL5). It is highly expressed in eosinophils and basophils, and is also detected in TH1 and TH2 cells, as well as in airway epithelial cells. This receptor may contribute to the accumulation and activation of eosinophils and other inflammatory cells in the allergic airway, and possibly at sites of parasitic infection. It is also known to be an entry co-receptor for HIV-1, enabling viral infection in cells that also express CD4, the receptor of HIV-1.  This gene and seven other chemokine receptor genes form a chemokine receptor gene cluster on the chromosomal region 3p21. Alternatively spliced transcript variants encoding the same protein have been described.

See also 
 Cluster of differentiation

Interactions 

CCR3 (gene) has been shown to interact with CCL5.

References

Further reading

External links 
 
 
 

Chemokine receptors
Clusters of differentiation